Nogometni klub Jedinstvo Bihać is a professional association football club based in the city of Bihać, Bosnia and Herzegovina.

The club's stadium is called Pod Borićima Stadion and it has capacity for 7,500 spectators. The fans of NK Jedinstvo are called Sila Nebeska.

History
The first football club in Bihać was founded around 1919 or 1920, with the exact date being unknown due to a non-payment of a membership fee to the football association. NK Jedinstvo was registered with the football association for the first time in 1937.

NK Jedinstvo spent several years playing in the Yugoslav Second League between 1979 and the time of their relegation in 1986.

The club appeared in the 1999 UEFA Intertoto Cup, making it to the second round of the competition, eliminating Faroese club GÍ Gøtu in the first round and then getting eliminated by CSM Ceahlăul Piatra Neamț in the second round.

In the 2003–04 league season, Jedinstvo led the start of the Bosnian Premier League, but would fall to last place and be relegated. In the 2004–05 season, Jedinstvo played in the First League of the Federation of Bosnia and Herzegovina, and was promoted back to the Premier League.

In the 2007–08 Premier League season, they were relegated back to the First League of FBiH, where they have been playing ever since.

Supporters
Jedinstvo's fans are called Sila Nebeska. Sila Nebeska group from Bihać was founded in 1996.

Honours

Domestic

League
First League of Bosnia and Herzegovina:
Winners (1): 1999–2000 (First Round)
First League of the Federation of Bosnia and Herzegovina: 
Winners (1): 2004–05
Runners-up (1): 2013–14

European record

P = Matches played; W = Matches won; D = Matches drawn; L = Matches lost; GF = Goals for; GA = Goals against; GD = Goals difference. Defunct competitions indicated in italics.

List of matches

Club seasons
Source:

Historical list of coaches

  Boris Bračulj
  Besim Sabić (1999-2000)
  Nedžad Verlašević (2000)
  Mehmed Janjoš (2008)
  Kemal Alispahić (2008-2009)
  Amir Alagić (2009-2010)
  Šener Bajramović (2011)
  Nermin Karač (2012)
  Mehmed Janjoš (2013)
  Ivan Katalinić (2013)
  Ervin Smajlagić (27 Dec 2013-2014)
  Ahmet Kečalović (2014-23 Oct 2014)
  Mehmed Janjoš (12 Jan 2015-2015)
  Benjamin Ključanin (2015-10 Apr 2016)
  Selam Tulić (2016)
  Nedžad Žerić (2017)
  Nermin Karač (3 Aug 2017-2017)
  Safet Nadarević (30 Dec 2017-2018)
  Vlado Jagodić (6 Jul 2018-2019)
  Senad Repuh (17 Sep 2019-2020)
  Muhamed Berberović (18 Jan 2020-2020)
  Damir Beća (15 Sep 2020-2020)
  Jasmin Džidić (30 Jan 2021-)

References

External links
NK Jedinstvo Bihać at Facebook

 
Association football clubs established in 1919
NK Jedinstvo Bihac
NK Jedinstvo Bihac
Football clubs in Yugoslavia
NK Jedinstvo Bihac
Football clubs in Bosnia and Herzegovina